Ranjini is a form of Carnatic music.

Ranjini may also refer to:

 Ranjini Haridas, a TV anchor and model
 Ranjini (actress)